Bardai Brahmins are a community living in Western India. They traditionally have a variety of professions, including priesthood, merchants, revenue collectors, teachers, and village policemen.

References

External links 
Bardai Brahmin Samaj - London
 Bardai Brahmin Samaj - Leicester
 Bardai Brahmin Samaj - Northamptonshire
 Bardai Bramha Samaj Nani Naat - Jamnagar - India

Brahmin communities of Gujarat
Social groups of Gujarat